Birûn is the Persian word for "outside".

Suburb of Central Asian city
According to Doğan Kuban and V. Barthold, in the Turco-Iranian world, cities were usually made up of three sections: the city proper (Shahristan), the citadel (Kuhandiz), and the Rabat or Birûn, standing next to the Shahristan and often being home to commercial activities.

Ottoman sultan's "Outer Courtyard"
Birûn was the term used in the Ottoman Empire to refer to the Outer Courtyard of the Topkapi Palace, as opposed to the Inner ones (Enderûn), which were only accessible to the Sultan and his slaves and family members. By extension, it was also applied to the Outer Service of the palace, including the administrative, military, and religious elite of the empire, as opposed to the Inner Service clustered around the Sultan's person.

References

Ottoman court